The 2023 Conference USA men's basketball tournament was held March 8–11, 2023, at Ford Center at The Star in Frisco, Texas. First round & quarterfinal games of the tournament was televised on ESPN+ while the semifinals & championship game was aired on CBS Sports Network. The winner of the tournament, Florida Atlantic, received the conference's automatic bid to the 2023 NCAA tournament.

Seeds
Teams were seeded by conference record. The top five teams received byes to the quarterfinals.

Schedule

Bracket 

* – Denotes overtime period

Note: * denotes overtime

Game summaries

First round

Quarterfinals

Semifinals

Championship Game 

*Game times: CT

See also 
2023 Conference USA women's basketball tournament
 Conference USA men's basketball tournament
 Conference USA

References

External links 
 Conference USA tournament Central

Tournament
Conference USA men's basketball tournament
Basketball competitions in Texas
College sports tournaments in Texas
Sports in Frisco, Texas
Conference USA men's basketball tournament
Conference USA men's basketball tournament